Jüri Kallas (born 20 April 1967) is an Estonian science fiction expert, translator, publisher and editor. 
Jüri Kallas has worked for publishers Elmatar and Fantaasia as a compiler and editor. He is currently working on handing out the Estonian Science Fiction Association award Stalker, developing the Estonian science fiction bibliography and is an active contributor for the online science-fiction magazine Reaktor. He has written afterwords for novels and collections. He has translated into Estonian texts by Vladimir Arenev, Alexander Belyaev, Kir Bulychev, Robert E. Howard, Rafał Kosik, Henry Kuttner, H. P. Lovecraft, H. L. Oldie, Viktor Pelevin, Alexandr Siletsky, Mikhail Uspensky, Ilya Varshavsky and others. In addition, Jüri Kallas has worked for different publishers, choosing and editing dozens of crime and romance novels and written forewords for them. He has also published literature criticism and his views and opinions about current political events in Estonia. He has been an editorial board member of the online magazine Algernon.

Publications

Anthologies (compiler)
 "Olend väljastpoolt meie maailma" (Öölane) Tartu: Elmatar, 1995
 "Stalker 2002" (Maailma fantastikakirjanduse tippteoseid) Tartu: Fantaasia, 2002

Collections (compiler and/or foreword)
H. P. Lovecraft "Pimeduses sosistaja" (Öölane) Tartu: Elmatar, 1996
Robert E. Howard "Conan ja Musta ranniku kuninganna" (Tempus fugit) Tartu: Elmatar, 1999
Robert E. Howard "Conan ja värelev vari" (Tempus fugit) Tartu: Elmatar, 2000
Robert E. Howard "Conan ja punane kants" (Tempus fugit) Tartu: Elmatar, 2000
Veiko Belials "Helesiniste Liivade laul" (Maailma fantastikakirjanduse tippteoseid) Tartu: Fantaasia, 2002
Indrek Hargla "Hathawareti teener" (Maailma fantaasiakirjanduse tippteosed) Tartu: Fantaasia, 2002
Robert E. Howard "Pimeduse rahvas" (Maailma fantaasiakirjanduse tippteosed) Tartu: Fantaasia, 2002
H. G. Wells "Mister Skelmersdale haldjamaal" (Hea tuju raamat) Tartu: Fantaasia, 2002 
Robert E. Howard "Aed täis hirmu" (Maailma fantastikakirjanduse tippteoseid) Tartu: Fantaasia, 2003
Stephen King "Kõik on mõeldav: 14 sünget lugu" Tallinn: Pegasus, 2003
Stephen King "Kõik on mõeldav: 14 sünget lugu" Tallinn: Pegasus, 2005
Indrek Hargla "Suudlevad vampiirid" (Eesti fantastikakirjanduse tippteosed) Tartu: Fantaasia, 2011

Novels (afterwords)
Isaac Asimov "Teine Asum" Tallinn: Eesti Raamat, 1996
Roger Zelazny "Valguse Isand" (Öölane) Tartu: Elmatar, 1997
Robert A. Heinlein "Nukkude isandad" (Tempus fugit) Tartu: Elmatar, 1998
Robert Silverberg "Aja maskid" (Tempus fugit) Tartu: Elmatar, 1998
Ray Bradbury "Vist on kuri tulekul" (Tempus fugit) Tartu: Elmatar, 1999
Arthur C. Clarke "Lapsepõlve lõpp" (Tempus fugit) Tartu: Elmatar, 1999
Philip K. Dick "Blade Runner: Kas androidid unistavad elektrilammastest?" (42) Tallinn: Tänapäev, 2001
Kurt Vonnegut "Kassikangas" (42) Tallinn: Tänapäev, 2001
Michael Moorcock "Saatusemerel purjetaja" (Maailma fantaasiakirjanduse tippteoseid) Tartu: Fantaasia, 2002
Tiit Tarlap "Meie, kromanjoonlased" (Ulmeguru soovitab) Pärnu: Ji, 2009

Appearances
5. märts 2013 lennukisadamas https://www.youtube.com/watch?v=m9_QO1Z7f6s Mereulmest, teadusulmest
13. detsember 2014 Tartu kirjanike majas https://www.youtube.com/watch?v=Jm_Mqi2jW7Y Ulmegeto – vajadus või paratamatus
19. juuli 2014 Estcon https://www.youtube.com/watch?v=vvyKUaD-cTs Ulmeraamatute kaanekujundused maailmas

References

Sources 
Eesti Wikipedia
Raamatukoi raamatupood
Kirjastus Elmatar
16 küsimust Jüri kallasele
kirjed e-kataloogis Ester

1967 births
Estonian editors
Estonian magazine editors
Living people
Estonian translators